A delay certificate (Japanese: , "certificate of lateness"; German: Bescheinigung über Zugverspätung, "certificate about train delay") is a documentation of proof issued by a railway company that its scheduled passenger train arrived at a station later than what is stipulated in the company's scheduled timetable.

This practice is only prevalent in private and public Japanese railway companies and Germany's Deutsche Bahn. Paris' RATP also issues such certificates under the name bulletin de retard if the delay is greater than 15 minutes. They can be used, for example, for late admission at university exams. In addition, a few bus companies in Japan have also adopted this practice.

The certificate is issued when delays as little as five minutes occur, and even for instances where the delay is caused by circumstances beyond the railway company's control (e.g. foul weather, person under train). Handwritten certificates or printouts given out (generally in 10 × 15 cm strips) by conductors or station staff can be collected by passengers affected by lateness or delay, who can then produce it to their superiors at school or work and considered as a valid reason for reporting late.

Major Japanese railway companies such as JR East, Tokyu Corporation and Tokyo Metro have introduced electronic versions of the delay certificates on their websites, which would remain there for a week or less. Affected passengers who were unable to or did not collect the certificate could alternatively access and download it into their mobile phones or computers, and print them out if necessary.

References

External links
  JR East e-Delay Certificates
  Tokyo Metro e-Delay Certificates

Passenger rail transport in Japan
Deutsche Bahn